John G. Smith Jr. was an American football tackle who played one season for the Philadelphia Eagles of the National Football League (NFL). He went to college at Florida. He was 6 feet, 2 inches tall, and 200 pounds. Smith appeared in just one game during his professional career.

References

Year of birth missing
Place of birth missing
Possibly living people
Florida Gators football players
Philadelphia Eagles players
American football tackles